Morrinhos may refer to one of the following places in Brazil:

 Morrinhos, Ceará, a city in the state of Ceará
 Morrinhos, Goiás, a city in the state of Goiás
 Morrinhos Futebol Clube, a football club in Morrinhos, Goiás
 Morrinhos do Sul, a municipality in the state of Rio Grande do Sul
 Morrinhos, Rio Grande do Sul, a city in the municipality